John Spring (1833 – 13 February 1907) was an Irish cricketer. He played eight first-class matches for Otago between 1877 and 1885.

See also
 List of Otago representative cricketers

References

External links
 

1833 births
1907 deaths
Irish cricketers
Otago cricketers
Cricketers from Dublin (city)